Catalá is a Spanish surname. It may refer to:

People

 Ana María Catalá, a Spanish footballer
 Concha Catalá, a Spanish actress
 José Catalá, a Spanish footballer
 José Agustín Catalá, a Venezuelan journalist
 Luis Álvarez Catalá, a Spanish painter
 Magin Catalá, a Spanish Catholic missionary
 María José Catalá, a Spanish politician
 Rafael Catalá, a Spanish politician
 Sebastià Sastre Catalá, a Spanish footballer

See also
 Catalan language
 SS Catala